Eichelbach is a small river of Hesse, Germany. It is a right tributary of the Weil in the village Rod an der Weil of Weilrod.

See also
List of rivers of Hesse

References

Rivers of Hesse
Rivers of Germany